Apventure to Atlantis is the sequel to Odyssey: The Compleat Apventure written by Bob Clardy and published by Synergistic Software in 1982.

Gameplay
This is a sequel to Odyssey: The Compleat Apventure whose story picks up with the player as ruler of this island and updates the format of the game to include internal areas displayed in the form of the then-current Mystery House game, and also incorporated a parser that allowed the use of  text adventure-style commands.

Reception
Softalk said "Atlantis is a worthy successor to its progenitor; preserving many of the original's noblest achievements and adding refinements that in turn promise even greater things in future Apventures."

Creative Computing said "The game has sound, color, animation, excitement, and – for when you're really stuck – a hint sheet. If you find static adventures boring, try this one."

The 1984 Software Encyclopedia from Electronic Games rated the game an 8 out of 10 and said "Colorful, animated visuals decorate this entertaining cross between action adventures and arcade-style games."

Reviews
Casus Belli (Issue 14 - Apr 1983)

References

1982 video games
Adventure games
Apple II games
Apple II-only games
Role-playing video games
Synergistic Software games
Video games developed in the United States
Video games set in Atlantis